Boris Borisovich Glinsky (12 October 1860, Saint Petersburg, Russian Empire, – 30 November 1917, Petrograd, Soviet Russia) was a Russian writer, publicist, publisher, editor and politician. A prominent historian and biographer, Glinsky published numerous articles and essays, mainly in Istorichesky Vestnik, which he was also the editor of in 1913–1917, Severny Vestnik (editor and publisher in 1890—1891), and Russkaya Budushchnost (Russian Future, 1915—1917). Described as a 'progressive nationalist', Glinsky supported both the 1917 February Revolution and the Kornilov affair. As a result, in August 1917 he was arrested on the counter-revolutionary charges, but in October 1917 was released. Glinsky died in Petrograd on 30 November 1917.

Select bibliography
 A Republican at the Russian Court (1888)
 Vladimir Yakovlevich Stoyunin (1889)
 Orest Fyodorovich Miller (1889)
 The Magnanimous Conquest (1890)
 The Judicial Eloquence in Russia (1897)
 The Tsar's Children and Their Tutors (1899)
 The Sketches on the Russian Progress (1900)
 Fighting For the Constitution (. 1908)
 The Revolutionary Period in the Russian History (parts 1 and 2, 1913)

References 

1860 births
1917 deaths
Writers from Saint Petersburg
Russian editors